Høgskavlpiggen Peak is a peak rising from the western part of Høgskavlen Mountain, in the Borg Massif of Queen Maud Land, Antarctica. It was mapped by Norwegian cartographers from surveys and air photos by the Norwegian–British–Swedish Antarctic Expedition (1949–52) and named Høgskavlpiggen (the high snowdrift peak).

References

Mountains of Queen Maud Land
Princess Martha Coast